FEP may refer to

 Features, events, and processes, in radioactive waste management
 Federação Escotista de Portugal, the Scouting Federation of Portugal
 Federation of European Professional Photographers
 Federation of European Publishers
 FEP Sports, a paintball equipment manufacturer
 Fluorinated ethylene propylene
 Filaments evaluation protocol, a 3D printing methodology
 Foreign education provider, in India
 Fort Edmonton Park, in Edmonton, Alberta, Canada
 Forum for European Philosophy
 Franklin Electronic Publishers, an American electronics manufacturer
 Free energy perturbation
 Free Egyptians Party, a political party in Egypt
 Free erythrocyte porphyrin
 Front endpaper
 Front-end processor
 Full electric propulsion
 Tuen Mun Ferry Pier stop, Hong Kong (MTR station code)

See also 
 FeP, iron phosphide